A highwayman was a criminal who robbed travelers on the road.

Highwayman, highwaymen, or highway men may also refer to:

People
 The Highwaymen (country supergroup), a 1985–1995 country music supergroup
 The Highwaymen (folk band), a 1960s collegiate folk band
 The Highwaymen (landscape artists), a group of 20th-century African-American landscape painters from Florida

Arts, entertainment, and media

Films 
 Highwaymen (film), a 2004 film 
 The Highwayman (1951 film), a 1951 film
 The Highwaymen (film), a 2019 film

Literature
 The Highway Men (MacLeod novel), a 2006 novella by Ken MacLeod
 "The Highwayman" (poem), a 1906 poem by Alfred Noyes
 "The Highwayman", a short story by Lord Dunsany later made into a short film
The Highwayman, a 1962 novel by Sylvia Thorpe
The Highwayman, a 1955 novel by Noel Gerson
The Highwayman, a 1955 novel by Frank Gruber (writer)
The Highwayman, a 1996 novel by Madeline Harper
 The Highwayman (novel), a 2004 novel by R. A. Salvatore

Comics
The Highwayman, a comic book adaptation of Salvatore's novel by Matthew Hansen
 The Highwaymen, a limited series comic book by Lee Garbett

Music

Albums
 Highwayman (The Highwaymen album) (aka Highwayman 1), 1985, from the country music supergroup; including a cover of the Jimmy Webb song
 Highwayman 2 (The Highwaymen album), 1990; from the country music supergroup
 Highwayman (Glen Campbell album), including a cover of the Jimmy Webb song
 The Highwayman (The Highwayman album), 1960, from the folk music group The Highwaymen (folk band)

Songs
 "Highway Man", a song by Hoffmaestro & Chraa
 "Highwayman" (song), a song by Jimmy Webb
 "Highwayman", a song by Brotherhood of Man from Images
The Highwayman, an operetta by Reginald De Koven and Harry B. Smith
 "The Highwayman", a song by Loreena McKennitt from The Book of Secrets, based on the Noyes poem (see above)
 "The Highwayman", a song by Phil Ochs from I Ain't Marching Anymore, based on the Noyes poem
 "The Highwayman", a song by Stevie Nicks from Bella Donna
 "The Highwayman", a song by The White Buffalo from The Highwayman Single

Other uses in arts, entertainment, and media
 Highwayman, a vehicle in the video game Fallout 2
 The Highwayman (musical), an Australian musical comedy by Edmond Samuels
 The Highwayman (TV series), a short-lived (1987–1988) American action-adventure series starring Sam J. Jones

Other uses
 B5470 road, in Cheshire, England; referred to as The Highwayman after a roadside pub
 Highwaymen Motorcycle Club, an American motorcycle club
 Highwayman's hitch, a type of quick-release knot

See also

 
 
 
 
 Highway (disambiguation)
 Men (disambiguation)
 Man (disambiguation)